Jeizon Jesús Ramírez Chacón (born 24 March 2001) is a Venezuelan footballer who plays as a winger for Deportivo Táchira.

Career statistics

Club

Notes

References

2001 births
Living people
Venezuelan footballers
Venezuelan expatriate footballers
Association football midfielders
Venezuelan Primera División players
Deportivo Táchira F.C. players
Real Salt Lake players
Venezuelan expatriate sportspeople in the United States
Expatriate soccer players in the United States
Designated Players (MLS)
Major League Soccer players
People from San Cristóbal, Táchira
21st-century Venezuelan people